The 1998 UCI Track Cycling World Cup Classics is a multi race tournament over a season of track cycling. The season ran from 21 May 1998 to 6 September 1998. The World Cup is organised by the UCI.

Results

Men

Women

References 
Round 1, Cali (Results archived on June 10, 2009)
Round 2, Victoria (Results archived on June 9, 2010)
Round 3, Berlin (Results archived on June 9, 2010)
Round 4, Hyères (Results archived on June 9, 2010)

World Cup Classics
UCI Track Cycling World Cup